Michael Louis Chernus (born August 8, 1977) is an American actor. He has acted on film, television, and the stage. He is perhaps best known for his role as Cal Chapman on the Netflix original comedy-drama series Orange Is the New Black (2013–2019). Chernus played Phineas Mason / Tinkerer in the Marvel Cinematic Universe film Spider-Man: Homecoming, which was released on July 7, 2017.

Life and career
Chernus was born in Rocky River, Ohio. He is a graduate of the Juilliard School's Drama Division. An accomplished stage actor, Michael won a 2011 Obie Award and received a Lucille Lortel Award nomination for his performance in Lisa Kron's In the Wake at The Public Theater in New York City. On stage, he co-starred with David Hyde Pierce in the Manhattan Theater Club production of Close Up Space at New York City Center. Other New York credits include such theaters as Playwrights Horizons, the Roundabout Theatre Company, Primary Stages, New York Theatre Workshop, The Atlantic Theater Company, and many productions at the Rattlestick Playwrights Theater, where he played the lead role of KJ in Annie Baker's play, The Aliens, which Charles Isherwood, of The New York Times, named the best play of 2010.

His most recent role was Second Stage Theatre's production of Lips Together, Teeth Apart, co-starring America Ferrera. Chernus has acted in films such as Men in Black 3, Captain Phillips, The Bourne Legacy, and Jack and Diane. His most notable role to date is Cal Chapman, protagonist Piper Chapman's brother, in the Netflix original comedy-drama series Orange Is the New Black.

Filmography

Film

Television

Stage

Awards and nominations

References

External links
 
 

Male actors from Ohio
American male film actors
American male television actors
Living people
People from Rocky River, Ohio
21st-century American male actors
1977 births